Astrid Mangi (born 16 January 1989) is an Austrian former competitive figure skater in ladies' singles. She won the bronze medal at the 2006 Austrian Championships and qualified for the free skate at the 2006 World Junior Championships, where she finished 16th.

Programs

Competitive highlights 
JGP: Junior Grand Prix

References

External links
 

Austrian female single skaters
1989 births
Living people
Sportspeople from Wiener Neustadt
21st-century Austrian women